Valerio Mazzola (born 7 March 1988) is an Italian basketball player for Victoria Libertas Pesaro of the Italian Lega Basket Serie A (LBA). He is a 6 ft 9 in (2.05 m) power forward and center.

Professional career
On March 28, 2011, Valerio Mazzola signed with Sutor Basket Montegranaro in Lega Basket Serie A.

On August 4, 2014, Mazzola signed with the LBA club Virtus Bologna..

On July 4, 2016, he went to Turin to play with Auxilium Torino.

On July 18, 2018, Mazzola signed a deal with Reyer Venezia. He signed a multi-year contract extension with the team on 20 June 2020.

On July 1, 2022, he signed with Victoria Libertas Pesaro of the Italian Lega Basket Serie A (LBA).

Honours
Auxilium Torino
 Italian Cup (1): 2018

References

External links
 Lega Basket Serie A profile  Retrieved 10 June 2019
 Serie A2 profile  Retrieved 10 June 2019

1988 births
Living people
Auxilium Pallacanestro Torino players
Centers (basketball)
Italian men's basketball players
Lega Basket Serie A players
Sportspeople from Ferrara
Reyer Venezia players
Sutor Basket Montegranaro players
Victoria Libertas Pallacanestro players
Virtus Bologna players